The tenth series of British talent competition programme Britain's Got Talent was broadcast on ITV, from 9 April to 28 May 2016. To celebrate ten series of the show, the final featured a special performance entitled "Best of Britain’s Got Talent", which featured several participants who had appeared on the show during the previous nine series, including Ashleigh and Pudsey, Attraction, Diversity, Jon Clegg, Stavros Flatley, Collabro and Spelbound. It was the last series to have its live episodes broadcast at The Fountain Studios before the site's closure that year.

The tenth series was won by magician Richard Jones finishing in first place, and jazz singer Wayne Woodward finishing in second place. During its broadcast, the series averaged around 9.5 million viewers. Although the main programme faced no major incidents, its companion show Britain's Got More Talent caused controversy for incorporating a segment that was later criticised by Simon Cowell.

Series overview
Following open auditions held between October to December 2015, including an additional one on 10 January 2016, the Judges' auditions took place between January and February 2016, within Liverpool, Birmingham, and London. There were no major incidents amongst the judging panel that forced them to be absent, although Simon Cowell arrived late for the London auditions on 23 January - David Walliams's mother, Kathleen Williams, who was attending these, stood in for him for a number of auditions until he arrived.

Of the participants that took part, only forty-five made it into the five live semi-finals - of these acts, singer Beau Dermott, gospel choir 100 Voices of Gospel, singer Jasmine Elcock, singing duo Anne & Ian Marshall, and dance troupe Boogie Storm, each received a golden buzzer during their auditions - with nine appearing in each one, and twelve of these acts making it into the live final; the Judges' Wildcard was dancing duo Shannon & Peter, who lost the Judges' vote in the second semi-final, while the Public Wildcard was dog act Trip Hazard, who lost the Judges' vote in the final semi-final.

The following below lists the results of each participant's overall performance in this series:

 |  |  | 
 Judges' Wildcard Finalist |  Public Wildcard Finalist |  Golden Buzzer Audition

  Ages denoted for a participant(s), pertain to their final performance for this series.
  Locations denote where members from each respective group came from.
  For health & safety reason, the nature of Alex Magala's performance required these to be pre-recorded as a precaution in the live rounds.
  Locations for members of each respective 
 group, or the group as a whole, were not disclosed during their time on the programme.

Semi-finals summary
 Buzzed out |  Judges' vote | 
 |  |

Semi-final 1 (22 May)
Guest Performers, Results Show: Cast of Motown: The Musical

Semi-final 2 (23 May)
Guest Performers, Results Show: OneRepublic

  Shannon & Peter were later sent through to the final as the judges' wildcard.

Semi-final 3 (24 May)
Guest Performer, Results Show: Nick Jonas

  For technical reasons, Flying Bebop's performance had to be pre-recorded before the semi-final.

Semi-final 4 (25 May)
Guest Performers, Results Show: Jules, Matisse & Friends

  Dixon pressed Walliams and Holden's buzzers during Bespoke Candi's performance.
  Cowell did not cast his vote, due to the majority support for Balance Unity from the other judges, but admitted his voting intention would have been for them.

Semi-final 5 (26 May)
Guest Performers, Results Show: Fifth Harmony

  Trip Hazard were later sent through to the final as the public's wildcard.

Final (28 May)
Guest Performers, Results Show: Katherine Jenkins, Clean Bandit & Louisa Johnson, Jamie Raven, Attraction, Diversity, Ashleigh and Pudsey, Kieran Gaffney, George Sampson, Old Men Grooving, Jon Clegg, Stavros Flatley, Collabro and Spelbound

 |

Ratings

  Excludes ITV+1.

Controversy
Production staff working on Britain's Got More Talent created controversy after a live episode of the tenth series, when they conducted a segment to celebrate the tenth year of Britain's Got Talent with a special contest. The contest focused on the sister show's host, Stephen Mulhern, asking trivia questions about the main programme and awarding puppies to the judges for each correct answer given. After the segment was completed and the programme entered a commercial break, Simon Cowell became concerned over the well-being of the animals, and criticised staff members for a poorly conceived stunt. While Mulhern had to apologise to viewers for what was shown on television,  Cowell made it clear to the producers that such a stunt would not be repeated.

References

2016 British television seasons
Britain's Got Talent